Mount Tapochau is the highest point on the island of Saipan in the Northern Mariana Islands. It is located in the center of the island, north of San Vicente village and northwest of Magicienne Bay, and rises to a height of 474 m (1555 ft). The mountain offers a 360 degree view of the island. Mount Tapochau was vital in World War II as a result of this.

As of 2016, the only road up to Mount Tapochau is a long, winding, uphill climb over endless loose rocks and massive potholes. The road looks as though it has been repeatedly eroded by heavy rain over many years. This path would be dangerous to traverse in wet weather and should only be approached in a heavy duty vehicle in dry weather.

Geology 

The base of Mount Tapochau is covered with phosphate, manganese ore, sulphur, and coral limestone. The peak is also a limestone formation.

References
 History of Mount Taptochau 
 Geology of Mount Tapochau
 Geological sections across Saipan (see section B)

Landforms of the Northern Mariana Islands
Saipan
Mountains of Oceania